A list of the films produced in Mexico in 1976 (see 1976 in film):

See also
1976 in Mexico

External links

1976
Films
Mexican